Strike Fighter Squadron 11 (VFA-11) is a United States Navy strike fighter squadron stationed at Naval Air Station Oceana, Virginia, United States. The squadron was established in 1950 and is nicknamed "Red Rippers" (call sign "Ripper").  VFA-11 is equipped with the Boeing F/A-18F Super Hornet and currently assigned to Carrier Air Wing One.

Insignia and nickname

The Red Ripper squadron insignia as described by an early member: "The boar's head is taken from the one that graces the label of the Gordon's Gin bottle. The scroll effect under the head is a string of link sausage, a good line of bologna which all members of the squadron were to be adept at 'shooting.' The balls on the shield might be called balls of fire; actually, they were supposed to typify good, strong masculinity. The bolt of lightning was the bar sinister of bastardy. The whole theme was worked into a sort of toast or creed with which the squadron members were to begin and end all good drinking bouts. The official Ripper toast is, 'Here's to us, the RED RIPPERS – a damn bunch of gin drinking, bologna slinging, two-balled, he-man bastards'." In 2011, while on liberty in Bahrain, high ranking authorities declared the toast inappropriate and offensive; the toast was banned shortly thereafter. Slowly since, the toast has returned in more informal settings.

History
Three distinct squadrons have been designated VF-11, and two distinct squadrons have been known as the Red Rippers. The first VF-11 (never known as the Red Rippers) was established in 1942, was redesignated VF-111 in 1948, and was disestablished in January 1959. The second VF-11, known as the Red Rippers was established in 1927 and went through numerous redesignations before being disestablished in February 1959. The third distinct squadron was established as VF-43 in 1950, was eventually redesignated VFA-11, and is the primary subject of this article. Officially, the US Navy does not recognize a direct lineage with disestablished squadrons if a new squadron is formed with the same designation. Often, the new squadron will assume the nickname, insignia, and traditions of the earlier squadrons.

1950s

On 1 September 1950, Fighter Squadron 43 (VF-43), known as Rebel's Raiders, was established at NAS Jacksonville, Florida.  They moved to NAS Cecil Field on 18 September 1950, and were initially outfitted with new F4U-5N Corsair night-fighters. The squadron traded its night fighters for F4U-5s (day fighters) in October 1950. The squadron's first deployment was aboard  to the Mediterranean from April–October 1951.

In February 1952, the squadron transitioned to the F4U-4 and deployed to the Med aboard .

In the mid-1950s, the squadron transitioned to the F9F-8 Cougar, and later shifted to F2H Banshees. In February 1958, the squadron deployed to the Mediterranean aboard  with McDonnell F2H-4 Banshees. They provided air cover for the landings in Lebanon and were sent through the Suez Canal to the Taiwan Straits during the Quemoy-Matsu shelling by Communist Chinese. Upon returning to the states, they were stationed at NAS Jacksonville to be disestablished on 15 February 1959, however; instead, on 16 February 1959 (the day after the second VF-11 was disestablished), VF-43 was redesignated as VF-11 at NAS Cecil Field, flying F-8 Crusaders. They adopted the traditions and insignia of the first Red Rippers (although they do not claim the lineage).

1960s
VF-11 deployed aboard , where during the unrest in the Dominican Republic following the assassination of Rafael Trujillo in 1961. VF-11 was the first operational squadron to receive the F8U-2NE, receiving its first aircraft on February 8, 1962.

In January 1966 the squadron traded their F-8Es for F-8Ds. In the late 1966, they moved to NAS Oceana and transitioned to the F-4B Phantom.

The squadron saw its first combat on July 25, 1967 over North Vietnam operating from USS Forrestal.  The brief combat period on Yankee Station was cut short when, on July 29, 1967, the Forrestal fire occurred. VF-11 lost 47 men in the catastrophe.

1970s
The squadron made several Mediterranean cruises in the 1970s aboard Forrestal. In 1972, they landed an F-4B aboard  in a cross-deck exercise.

On 20 August 1973, the squadron received its first F-4J, beginning the transition from the F-4B.

1980s

The squadron transitioned to the F-14 Tomcat in 1980 and deployed two years later. The squadron's combat debut in the F-14 occurred in early December 1983 when VF-11 aircraft engaged eight Syrian Air Force MiGs over Lebanon and were fired upon by Syrian Surface-to-air missiles (SAM) and anti-aircraft artillery. On 4 December 1983 the squadron flew combat air patrols over a Navy strike force from the carrier , while A-6E Intruders from the John F. Kennedy attacked Syrian positions in the Bekaa Valley. The strikes were in response to the Syrian SAM and AAA engagements. The pilot of the A-6 crew died while the bombardier/navigator Lt Bobby Goodman was held prisoner by the Syrians for 30 days before being released. While they were deployed for operations in Lebanon, one aircraft sustained damage from a suspected surface-to-air missile. VF-11 and three other squadrons from CVW-3 and the USS John F. Kennedy won Battle E's for 1983. VF-11 also won the Safety 'S'.

After three cruises with Carrier Air Wing Three and the Kennedy Battle Group, VF-11 and its sister squadron transferred to Carrier Air Wing Six and USS Forrestal. In 1985 VF-11 won the Battle E award as the best fighter squadron in the Atlantic Fleet and the Joseph C. Clifton award as the best fighter squadron in the Navy. They deployed again in 1986, and stayed with CVW-6/Forrestal until its last cruise in 1991, making a total of five deployments.

1990s

In January 1992, VF-11 and VF-31 moved to NAS Miramar and transitioned to the F-14D Tomcat. VF-11's F-14As were transferred to VF-24 and VF-211.

In February 1994, VF-11 and CVW-14 deployed aboard , in support of Operation Southern Watch, returning to NAS Miramar on August 15.

In late 1994, VF-11 acquired Night vision goggles requiring substantial changes to the F-14's internal and instrument lighting.

In 1995, VF-11 received upgrades to their mission computers, providing air-to-ground ordnance capability. VF-11 sent their first aircrews to Forward Air Controller school in September 1995.  Also in 1995, VF-11 was aboard Carl Vinson when she visited Hawaii for the 50th anniversary of Victory over Japan Day

In May 1996, CVW-14 deployed with Carl Vinson in support of Operation Southern Watch.  On 31 August, the Iraqi army attacked the town or Irbil in northern Iraq and several SAM missiles were launched against U.S. aircraft. The United States responded with Operation Desert Strike by attacking  targets in the southern no-fly zone with cruise missiles launched from B-52s escorted by VF-11 Tomcats. USS Carl Vinson left the Gulf on 1 October.

Upon return from deployment, VF-11 moved to NAS Oceana as the United States Marine Corps took over Miramar. At the same time, VF-11 transitioned to the F-14B and changed air wings to Carrier Air Wing Seven.

In 1997, VF-11 was awarded the Battle E and Clifton Awards as the squadron celebrated their 70th Anniversary. Also that year, VF-11 received the LANTIRN infrared targeting pod and dropped their first GBU-16 laser-guided bomb.

In February 1998, the squadron deployed from Norfolk with CVW-7 aboard  on its maiden voyage/world deployment.  They supported Operation Southern Watch, travelled to Australia and Pearl Harbor before the carrier arrived at its new home, Naval Air Station North Island.

2000s
VF-11 made a deployment in 2000 aboard , in support of Operation Southern Watch.

Seven hours after the September 11 attacks, VF-11 emergency sortied all squadron aircraft aboard  to support Operation Noble Eagle.

They deployed in support of Operation Enduring Freedom in early February 2002, and employed the first JDAM bombs from F-14s in combat on 11 March 2002.

In 2004 VF-11 deployed for the last time with the F-14 aboard  in support of Operation Iraqi Freedom.  During that cruise, VF-11 F-14s participated in the bombing of Fallujah during a 48-hour period between 28 and 29 April.

On 20 April 2005, VF-11 delivered the last of their F-14s to the “boneyard” at Davis-Monthan Air Force Base in Tucson, Arizona.

The squadron reported to VFA-106 for F/A-18 Super Hornet transition training, completing on 5 November 2005.

In May 2006, VFA-11 deployed to the Caribbean Sea supporting the Partnership of the Americas for two months as part of Carrier Air Wing Seventeen.

VFA-11 and the rest of CVW-3 returned home on 4 June 2008.

2010s

In January 2011, VFA-11 joined CVW-1 on board  for a deployment supporting Operation Enduring Freedom in the U.S. 5th Fleet area of responsibility.

On 11 March 2015, the Theodore Roosevelt Carrier Strike Group departed Naval Station Norfolk for around the world tour with deployments to the U.S. 5th, 6th and 7th Fleets, before arriving in their new homeport of San Diego, California.

See also
Naval aviation
List of United States Navy aircraft squadrons
List of Inactive United States Navy aircraft squadrons

References
VF-11 History
Squadron History VF-11 Red Rippers
Lebanon: VF-11 and VF-31 in Lebanon
US Multinational Force (USMNF) Lebanon
VFA-11 Red Rippers Web Page
Tony Holmes (2005). US Navy F-14 Tomcat Units of Operation Iraqi Freedom, Osprey Publishing Limited.

Notes

Strike fighter squadrons of the United States Navy